In physics, the Rabi cycle (or Rabi flop) is the cyclic behaviour of a two-level quantum system in the presence of an oscillatory driving field. A great variety of physical processes belonging to the areas of quantum computing, condensed matter, atomic and molecular physics, and nuclear and particle physics can be conveniently studied in terms of two-level quantum mechanical systems, and exhibit Rabi flopping when coupled to an oscillatory driving field. The effect is important in quantum optics, magnetic resonance and quantum computing, and is named after Isidor Isaac Rabi.

A two-level system is one that has two possible energy levels. These two levels are a ground state with lower energy and an excited state with higher energy. If the energy levels are not degenerate (i.e. not having equal energies), the system can absorb a quantum of energy and transition from the ground state to the "excited" state. When an atom (or some other two-level system) is illuminated by a coherent beam of photons, it will cyclically absorb photons and re-emit them by stimulated emission. One such cycle is called a Rabi cycle, and the inverse of its duration is the Rabi frequency of the photon beam. The effect can be modeled using the Jaynes–Cummings model and the Bloch vector formalism.

Mathematical description
A detailed mathematical description of the effect can be found on the page for the Rabi problem. For example, for a two-state atom (an atom in which an electron can either be in the excited or ground state) in an electromagnetic field with frequency tuned to the excitation energy, the probability of finding the atom in the excited state is found from the Bloch equations to be

 

where  is the Rabi frequency.

More generally, one can consider a system where the two levels under consideration are not energy eigenstates. Therefore, if the system is initialized in one of these levels, time evolution will make the population of each of the levels oscillate with some characteristic frequency, whose angular frequency is also known as the Rabi frequency. The state of a two-state quantum system can be represented as vectors of a two-dimensional complex Hilbert space, which means that every state vector  is represented by complex coordinates:

 

All observable physical quantities associated with this systems are 2 × 2 Hermitian matrices, which means that the Hamiltonian of the system is also a similar matrix.

Procedure
One can construct an oscillation experiment through the following steps:

 Prepare the system in a fixed state; for example, 
 Let the state evolve freely, under a Hamiltonian H for time t
 Find the probability , that the state is in 

If  is an eigenstate of H,  and there will be no oscillations.

On the other hand, if H has no degenerate eigenstates, and the initial state is not an eigenstate, then there will be oscillations. The most general form of the Hamiltonian of a two-state system is given

This matrix can be decomposed as,

The matrix  is the 2  2 identity matrix and the matrices  are the Pauli matrices. Consider the case of a spin-1/2 particle in a magnetic field . The interaction Hamiltonian for this system is

, 

Let the system be prepared in state  at time . Note that  is an eigenstate of :

Here the Hamiltonian is time independent. So the state after time t is given by:

.

Now suppose the spin is measured in x-direction at time t. So in this case the probability of finding spin-up in x-direction is oscillatory in time  when the system's spin is initially in the  direction. In the degenerate case where , the characteristic frequency is 0 and there is no oscillation.

Notice that if a system is in an eigenstate of a given Hamiltonian, the system remains in that state.

This is true even for time dependent Hamiltonians.

{| class="toccolours collapsible collapsed" style="text-align:left" width="60%"
!Example of Rabi oscillation between two states in ionized hydrogen molecule.
|-
Because of their large masses, the two protons can be considered to be fixed. Assume, at a certain time, the electron is localised about proton .

This oscillation of the electron between the two states corresponds to an oscillation of the
mean value of the electric dipole moment of the molecule. Thus when the molecule is not in a stationary state, an oscillating electric dipole moment can appear.
Such an oscillating dipole moment can exchange energy with an electromagnetic wave of same frequency. Consequently, this frequency must appear in the absorption and emission spectrum of the ionized hydrogen molecule.
|
|}

Derivation using nonperturbative procedure by means of the Pauli matrices

Now, eigenvectors for  can be found from equationSoApplying the normalization condition on the eigenvectors, . So .

So we get .

The phase of  releative to  should be .

However, for a time-dependent Hamiltonian and a general initial state as shown above, the time evolution is non trivial. The resulting formula for the Rabi oscillation is valid because the state of the spin may be viewed in a reference frame that rotates along with the field.

Now the probability that a system in the state  will be found to be in the state  is given byThis can be simplified to 

This shows that there is a finite probability of finding the system in state  when the system is originally in the state . The probability is oscillatory with angular frequency , which is simply unique Bohr frequency of the system and also called Rabi frequency. The formula is known as Rabi formula.

These types of oscillations of two-level systems are called Rabi oscillations, which arise in many problems such as Neutrino oscillation, the ionized Hydrogen molecule, Quantum computing, Ammonia maser, etc.

In quantum computing
Any two-state quantum system can be used to model a qubit. Consider a spin- system with magnetic moment  placed in a classical magnetic field . Let  be the gyromagnetic ratio for the system. The magnetic moment is thus . One can find the eigenvalues and eigenvectors of this Hamiltonian by the above-mentioned procedure. Now, let the qubit be in state  at time . Then, at time , the probability of it being found in state  is given by   where . This phenomenon is called Rabi oscillation. This is called a  pulse. This operation has crucial importance in quantum computing. The equations are essentially identical in the case of a two level atom in the field of a laser when the generally well satisfied rotating wave approximation is made. In summary, Rabi oscillations are the basic process used to manipulate qubits. These oscillations are obtained by exposing qubits to periodic electric or magnetic fields during suitably adjusted time intervals.

See also

Atomic coherence
Bloch sphere
Laser pumping
Optical pumping
Rabi problem
Vacuum Rabi oscillation
 Neutral particle oscillation

References

 Quantum Mechanics Volume 1 by C. Cohen-Tannoudji, Bernard Diu, Frank Laloe, 
 A Short Introduction to Quantum Information and Quantum Computation by Michel Le Bellac, 
 The Feynman Lectures on Physics, Volume III
 Modern Approach To Quantum Mechanics by John S Townsend, 

Quantum optics
Atomic physics